Tanja Klein (born 20 November 1969 in Munich, Germany) is a track and road cyclist who represented Austria. She competed at the 1996 Summer Olympics on the road in the women's road race and women's trial and on the track in the women's points race. She won the Austrian National Road Race Championships in 1995, 1996 and 1998.

References

External links
 profile at sports-reference.com

Austrian female cyclists
Cyclists at the 1996 Summer Olympics
Olympic cyclists of Austria
Living people
Cyclists from Munich
1969 births
20th-century Austrian women